The 1933 Sumatra earthquake or Liwa earthquake occurred in West Lampung Regency, Lampung Province, Indonesia on June 25. The earthquake had an estimated surface-wave magnitude of 7.7 occurring at a shallow depth of 20 km. It had an epicenter onshore, devastating the city of Liwa. At least 76 people were reported killed, although the death toll may have been in the thousands. Aftershocks followed, including one which was strong enough to cause additional fatalities. The mainshock also triggered a nearby volcanic eruption two weeks later, killing some people.

Tectonic setting

Convergence along this plate boundary is highly oblique, severely deforming the overriding Sunda Plate, where it is accommodated by strike-slip motion along the Great Sumatran fault. The Great Sumatran fault is a -long strike-slip fault system located on the island of Sumatra. The fault is divided into about 20 segments. The Great Sumatran fault was the source of the 1994 Liwa and 1995 Kerinci earthquakes. It produced its largest earthquake during the 1943 Alahan Panjang sequence; measuring  7.8. Most recently, a 6.2-magnitude quake struck in 2022.

Earthquake
The earthquake was caused by a strike-slip rupture on southern portion of the Great Sumatran Fault. Its epicenter was located between two segments; the Semangko segment located 50 km southeast, and the Kumering 60 km north. Based on the reports of damage, the earthquake ruptured in a northwesterly direction along the Kumering segment for approximately 130 km. The total length of the Kumering segment is 150 km, indicating partial failure on the segment. An average slip of 2.7 meters was estimated. Five moderate aftershocks were recorded, two of which were located 100 and 130 km northwest of the epicenter, respectively. There is a possibility that the fault rupture may have initiated on the northeastern portion of the Semangko segment, and progressed northwest to rupture the Kumering segment. A secondary branch away from the main strand of the Great Sumatran Fault may have also ruptured during the quake. Its epicenter is not far from that of the  6.8 earthquake in 1994. A surface rupture extended to Lake Ranau. No large magnitude 6.0 earthquakes would strike this portion of the Great Sumatran Fault until 1994.

Damage

Major destruction was widespread along an area that stretched from Lake Ranau to Suwoh (approximate length of the Kumering segment rupture). The earthquake had a maximum Modified Mercalli intensity of VIII–IX (Severe–Violent). Many buildings and other human infrastructures in the western portion of southern Sumatra were damaged. Large fissures and ground subsidence were reported; these effects were observed from Kota Agung to Makaka. Damage in Sebarus, a village in Lampung, was so severe that it forced all of its residents to leave. In Pasirah, every home was destroyed and rice fields were ruined. In Liwa and Banding Agung, the quake razed all buildings to the ground. Landslides were widespread, seen in the Barisan Mountains. An aftershock on June 26 caused several fatalities in Bengkulu. The total number of fatalities is not known, possibly several hundred or thousands, although the National Geophysical Data Center earthquake database only attributed 76 deaths with the event. Two weeks after the earthquake, geothermal activity at Suwoh increased, and a series of phreatic eruptions occurred, bringing ash to settlements. The eruption rated 4 on the VEI scale and also caused some deaths.

See also
 List of earthquakes in 1933
 List of earthquakes in Indonesia

References

Sources

External links

1933 earthquakes
Earthquakes in Indonesia
Earthquakes in Sumatra
1933 in the Dutch East Indies
West Lampung Regency
History of Lampung
20th-century volcanic events
VEI-4 eruptions
Bengkulu
Strike-slip earthquakes
Landslides in Indonesia
1933 disasters in Asia 
1933 disasters in Oceania 
20th-century disasters in Indonesia